Joy Wilhelmina Jordan (born 13 November 1935) is a former British 800 metres (middle distance) athlete in the early 1960s, who held the world record for 880 yards in 1960. In 1959, she was ranked third in the world at 800m.

Early life
She was born in Farnborough, Hampshire as Joy Wilhelmina Buckmaster. She had an older sister.

Career

1958 European Athletics Championships
She competed in the 800m at the 1958 European Athletics Championships in Stockholm, where she came ninth in the final.

1960 Olympics
She competed, aged 24, in the 800m at the 800 metres at the 1960 Summer Olympics in Rome, where she came sixth in the final with a time of 2:07.8. The world record was broken in the final by Lyudmila Shevtsova of the Soviet Union.

World records
A few weeks after the Olympics, in Welwyn Garden City in Hertfordshire on 24 September 1960, she ran 2:06.1 for the 880 yards, taking the world record from Nina Otkalenko (2:06.6) of the Soviet Union. Nina Otkalenko held the 800m world record for most of the 1950s.

On 14 June 1958 in London, she competed in the 4 × 400 metres relay in a British team which broke the world record with a time of 3:49.9. This record would hold until 5 August 1967, when a Swedish team took it to 3:49.4 at the Ryavallen, Borås in Sweden. The event was only recognised by the IAAF in 1969.

1962 European Championships
She competed in the 800m at the 1962 European Athletics Championships in Belgrade, coming fourth in the final with a British record of 2:05.0, and her career best at the 800m, where Gerda Kraan of the Netherlands won.

1962 British Empire and Commonwealth Games
She competed in the 880 yards at the 1962 British Empire and Commonwealth Games in Australia, where she gained a Bronze for England with 2:05.9.

Personal life
She married her coach from the 1960 Olympic Games, Dennis Jordan, in 1957 in north-west Surrey. She lives in Radcliffe-on-Trent in Nottinghamshire. She had a daughter in 1964, and a son in 1966.

See also
 Women's 4 × 400 metres relay world record progression
 800 metres world record progression

References

External links
 British Athletics Hall of Fame
 British Pathé October 1962

1935 births
People from Farnborough, Hampshire
People from Radcliffe-on-Trent
Sportspeople from Hampshire
Sportspeople from Nottinghamshire
English female middle-distance runners
Olympic athletes of Great Britain
Athletes (track and field) at the 1960 Summer Olympics
Commonwealth Games bronze medallists for England
Commonwealth Games medallists in athletics
Athletes (track and field) at the 1962 British Empire and Commonwealth Games
World record setters in athletics (track and field)
Living people
Medallists at the 1962 British Empire and Commonwealth Games